Ricci James Guarnaccio, is an English reality television personality and television presenter in the UK and Australia.

He is best known for Geordie Shore, Celebrity Big Brother, Ex on the Beach and Dinner Date. In 2016, he began filming Ultimate Worldie, an Australian television programme.

Personal life
He was engaged to fellow Geordie Shore star Vicky Pattison and was linked to Sallie Axl, and Lauren Goodger.

References

1986 births
Living people
Geordie Shore
People from Durham, England
Participants in British reality television series
Television personalities from County Durham